La bonne d'enfant (The Nanny) is an opérette bouffe, in one act by Jacques Offenbach to a French libretto by Eugène Bercioux.

It was first performed at the Théâtre des Bouffes Parisiens, Paris on 14 October 1856.  Offenbach's early operettas were small-scale one-act works, since the law in France limited musical theatre works (other than grand opera) to one-act pieces with no more than three singers and, perhaps, some mute characters.  In 1858, this law was changed, and Offenbach was able to offer full-length operettas, beginning with Orpheus in the Underworld. 

The piece was seen in 1857 at the St James's Theatre in London, and in Vienna in 1862 with Tostée as Dorothée; it was subsequently produced there in Hungarian.

Roles

Synopsis
Dorothée is tired of being a nanny and wants to marry to become the mistress of her own house.  She has two suitors: Mitouflard, the fireman and Gargaillou, the chimneysweep.  During an evening when her employers are out of the house, both gentlemen try to convince her to marry them, which leads to a number of comic situations.  She ends up deciding to marry 'Brin d'Amour', the trumpeter of the Royal Dragoons, but tells her suitors that she will invite them to her wedding.

References
Notes

External links
The libretto in French as submitted to the French Censors before the première
Information about the première date and location

Operas by Jacques Offenbach
French-language operas
Operas
One-act operas
Opérettes
1856 operas